Finn Film is a Finnish motion picture corporation. It was originally established in 1921, but made only one movie before finishing business in 1922. It was re-established in 2001.

Original corporation 
The original Finn Film was founded in 1921 in Oulu, Finland, by playwright Teuvo Pakkala, Dr. Toivo T. Kaila and M.Sc. G.H. Michelson.

Finn Film produced its first and only movie, Sotapolulla, in 1921.  It was shown ín movie theaters starting on 30 January 1922 (release date: 20 January 1922).  The screenplay for the film was written by Teuvo Pakkala.  The film - 65 minutes in length (1500 meters) - was also directed by Teuvo Pakkala.  The actors in the film included:

 Lisi Caren
 Yrjo Hirviseppa
 Jorma Vaajakallio
 Solveig Wohlstrom
 Lilly Caren
 Oskari Oka
 Bertel Nordenstreng
 J. V. Leino
 Hannes Seppanen
 Hildi Hartikainen
 Maija Pakkala
 Samuli Pakkala

Sotapolulla is currently archived in the National Audiovisual Archive of Finland.  Due to its old age, its politically interesting post-Finnish-Civil-War timing of production and its rare, good condition, it is considered historically valuable both nationally as well as internationally.

The original Finn Film finished business in 1922, mainly due to the lack of movie-watching audiences in theaters, following the Finnish Civil War.

Revived corporation 
The present-day Finn Film began service in 2001, following in the foot steps of the original founders, and it is still based in Oulu, Finland.

External links 
 Finn Film
 
 

Film production companies of Finland
Mass media in Oulu